Church of the Saviour and Cemetery is a historic Episcopal church and cemetery located at the junction of Church and Calhoun Streets in Jackson, Northampton County, North Carolina. It was built between 1896 and 1898, and is a Gothic Revival style granite and brownstone church.  It follows a basic gable-front plan and features a projecting three-stage entrance tower and separate sacristy.  Adjacent to the church is the cemetery established in 1853.

It was listed on the National Register of Historic Places in 2001.

References

Churches on the National Register of Historic Places in North Carolina
Gothic Revival church buildings in North Carolina
Churches completed in 1898
19th-century Episcopal church buildings
Buildings and structures in Northampton County, North Carolina
National Register of Historic Places in Northampton County, North Carolina
1898 establishments in North Carolina